Nucleotide-binding oligomerization domain-containing protein 1 (NOD1) is a protein receptor that in humans is encoded by the NOD1 gene. It recognizes bacterial molecules and stimulates an immune reaction .

NOD1 protein contains a caspase recruitment domain (CARD). NOD1 is a member of NOD-like receptor protein family and is a close relative of NOD2. NOD1 is an intracellular pattern recognition receptor, which is similar in structure to resistant proteins of plants, and mediates innate and acquired immunity by recognizing molecules containing D-glutamyl-meso-diaminopimelic acid (iE-DAP) moiety, including bacterial peptidoglycan. Nod1 interacts with RIPK2 through the CARDs of both molecules (See the structure of the NOD1 CARD in the right panel). Stimulation of NOD1 by iE-DAP containing molecules results in activation of the transcription factor NF-κB.

References

Further reading

External links 
 
 

LRR proteins
NOD-like receptors